Kamel Kadri (born 19 November 1963) is an Algerian footballer. He played in nine matches for the Algeria national football team in 1987 and 1992. He was also named in Algeria's squad for the 1988 African Cup of Nations tournament.

References

External links
 

1963 births
Living people
Algerian footballers
Algeria international footballers
1988 African Cup of Nations players
1990 African Cup of Nations players
1992 African Cup of Nations players
Africa Cup of Nations-winning players
Place of birth missing (living people)
Association footballers not categorized by position
21st-century Algerian people